Any Other City is the first and only studio album by Scottish indie rock band Life Without Buildings, released on 26 February 2001 in the United Kingdom and in 2002 in the United States.

Reception

Critical response

Matthew Willson of Drowned in Sound stated, "This album is a powerful reminder that the punk scene is still producing innovative and exciting new sounds." Drawing comparisons to bands such as The Slits and LiLiPUT, Andy Kellman of AllMusic commented, "These female-fronted groups have certainly inspired LWB, but this quartet -- simply a drummer, a bassist, a guitarist, and a vocalist -- offers much more than nostalgia and post-punk plundering. They're more of a pop band, which is just fine." Noel Murray of The A.V. Club noted the influences of Patti Smith and Sonic Youth, among others, stating that the songs "reduce the flavor and style of all of Life Without Buildings' influences—25 years of brainy girlpunk—and reproduce them on track after track," though he praised the group for their "great sound."

Sue Tompkins' unique vocal style was singled out in multiple reviews. While John Mulvey of NME compared Tompkins' voice to "the scrape of fingernails on a blackboard," opining that "only mad people and immediate family could warm to Tompkins," other critics were more receptive. Jenn Sikes of Splendid praised Tompkins' vocals, stating, "The chewed word-bits are like little metronomes, counting beats between her  words, which are spoken/sung in a cheery Scottish accent that's childlike but fierce." Kellman commented that "[h]er repet-pet-petitive repetitive style might be at odds with the ears of some listeners, but it's just as unique as the exuberant vocals" employed by Tompkins' influences. Connor McEleney of Structured Harmony praised bassist Chris Evans by describing him as "the stronghold underneath which Tompkins makes her unique sound palatable."

Legacy and impact 
Retrospectively, Any Other City has grown in reputation and influence. Tompkins' vocals have continued to attract acclaim, being called "the core around which the rest of the record revolves." Pitchforks Lindsay Zoladz praised her "extraordinary sense of rhythm" and "carefully metered" delivery. Stereogums Will Richards noted that through her rejecting the conventional uses of cadence and tone, she "[tore] apart the formulaic structure of a rock band", yielding "rarely seen and exhilarating" results. Zoladz saw the group's influence carry through into others including Los Campesinos!, Marnie Stern, Perfect Pussy, Ponytail, and more. She saw those bands bring Buildings' "sheer technical skill with a sense of ecstatic playfulness" into their own sensibilities.

Pitchfork placed Any Other City at number 128 on their list of the top 200 albums of the 2000s.

The album was re-released to rave reviews for Record Store Day on 19 April 2014 on the What's Your Rupture label. The vinyl issue included a 7" featuring alternate versions of "The Leanover" and "New Town".

Track listing
 "PS Exclusive" – 4:16
 "Let's Get Out" – 3:57
 "Juno" – 5:07
 "The Leanover" – 5:24
 "Young Offenders" – 3:10
 "Philip" – 2:29
 "Envoys" – 4:08
 "14 Days" – 3:11
 "New Town" – 5:53
 "Sorrow" – 6:55

Personnel
Life Without Buildings
Sue Tompkins – vocals
Robert Johnston – guitar
Chris Evans – bass
Will Bradley – drums

Additional personnel
Andy Miller – production, engineering

References

2001 albums
Life Without Buildings albums